Bishop John Alphonsus Ryan S.P.S. (b. 27 February 1952), is an Irish Catholic bishop and academic, who is the current Bishop of Mzuzu in Malawi.  Ryan was born in Holy Cross, Thurles, Co. Tipperary. He joined the Saint Patrick’s Society for the Foreign Missions (Kiltegan Fathers), studying Theology in Kiltegan, Wicklow, and Philosophy and Mathematics in University College Cork gaining a Masters and Doctorate in Mathematics (his doctorate on "Irreducible Goppa Codes" was done with Pat Fitzpatrick). Professor Ryan came to Malawi in 1978 shortly after his ordination.

Priesthood and career
Before being named Bishop of Mzuzu, Ryan lectured in Mathematics in Mzuzu University, and where he was a chaplain and professor of Mathematics beginning in 2000. His academic interests revolve around Coding Theory.

Episcopacy
In 2016 Pope Francis named Ryan as Bishop of Mzuzu. Ryan filled an empty see that had been vacated when Joseph Mukasa Zuza died on in an accident 15 January 2015.

References

1952 births
Living people
Alumni of University College Cork
20th-century Irish Roman Catholic priests
People from County Tipperary
21st-century Roman Catholic bishops in Malawi
Irish expatriate Catholic bishops
Irish mathematicians
Academic staff of Mzuzu University
Roman Catholic bishops of Mzuzu